TVR News was a niche Romanian TV channel that belonged to Romanian Television, the public TV broadcaster. Its programs were in collaboration with the European news channel Euronews.

TVR News was formerly known as TVR Info, a TV channel which stopped broadcasting following the economical recovery measures of the Public Television. Three months after its broadcast was suspended, the Public Television signed an agreement with the pan-European news channel Euronews. Following the signing, the TV channel relaunched under a new name: TVR News.

The channel was airing utility info, such as traffic news and weather, sport and news casts, feature-reports etc. However the news broadcasts can be received only by viewers on the territory of Romania.

References
  Company press release

Romanian Television
2012 establishments in Romania
2015 disestablishments in Romania
Television channels and stations established in 2012
Television channels and stations disestablished in 2015
24-hour television news channels in Romania
Defunct television channels in Romania